Andrea Domburg (1923–1997) was a Dutch film, stage and television actress. She was awarded the Theo d'Or in 1968 for her stage work. Her screen appearances were mostly in Dutch film and television, although she appeared in the 1958 American thriller Spy in the Sky! which was shot partly in the Netherlands. She played Queen Wilhelmina in the 1977 film Soldier of Orange.

Filmography

References

Bibliography
 Bas Agterberg, George Sluizer & Daniel Biltereyst. The Cinema of the Low Countries. Wallflower Press, 2004.

External links

1923 births
1999 deaths
Dutch film actresses
Dutch stage actresses
Dutch television actresses
Actresses from Amsterdam
20th-century Dutch actresses